William Burton (January 25, 1888 – October 16, 1944) was a Canadian politician, most prominent in his role as mayor of Hamilton, Ontario.

Born in Derby, England, Burton emigrated to Hamilton in 1907.  He subsequently established the Burton Coal Company.  Enlisting in the 120th City of Hamilton Battalion upon the outbreak of World War I, he rose to the rank of captain.

In 1924, he was elected as the alderman for Ward 6.  He was re-elected to that post in 1925.  He served the following two years on the Board of Control.

He was then elected Mayor of Hamilton twice, in 1928 and 1929.

1888 births
1944 deaths
Mayors of Hamilton, Ontario
Politicians from Derby